"Inside Out" is a song by American heavy metal band Five Finger Death Punch, released as the lead single from their eighth studio album, F8. The song has a radio edited version and an official video for it as well. In February 2020, the song topped the Billboard Mainstream Rock Songs chart.

Personnel
 Ivan Moody – vocals
 Zoltan Bathory – rhythm guitar
 Jason Hook – lead guitar
 Chris Kael – bass
 Charlie Engen – drums, percussion

Charts

Weekly charts

Year-end charts

References

Five Finger Death Punch songs
2019 songs
2019 singles
Song recordings produced by Kevin Churko
Songs written by Kevin Churko
Songs written by Zoltan Bathory
Songs written by Ivan Moody (vocalist)
Songs written by Jason Hook